Hayabusa is a Japanese robot asteroid mission from 2003 to 2010, a.k.a. MUSES-C.

Hayabusa (隼 or はやぶさ、ハヤブサ) is the Japanese word for a falcon, especially a Peregrine falcon. Hayabusa also may refer to:

Civilian transport 
Suzuki Hayabusa, motorcycle
Manshū Hayabusa, 1930s airliner

Rail 
 Hayabusa (train), Japanese train service
 Hayabusa, British Rail Class 43 (HST), train with Hitachi experimental hybrid-power technology
Hayabusa Station in Tottori Prefecture in Japan

Japanese military vehicles 
 Nakajima Ki-43 Hayabusa, World War II fighter airplane

Watercraft 
 Hayabusa-class torpedo boat of the Imperial Japanese Navy
 Hayabusa-class patrol boat, post-war Japan Maritime Self-Defense Force missile boat

Space exploration
 Hayabusa2, asteroid-targeted mission, launched in 2014
 Hayabusa Mk2, comet-targeted mission series, launching 2018 or later

Other 
 Eiji Ezaki (1968–2016), Japanese wrestler a.k.a. Hayabusa
Ryu Hayabusa, fictional video-game character
 Hayabusa: Harukanaru Kikan, film
 Goodbye Hayabusa, two professional wrestling events produced by Frontier Martial-Arts Wrestling (FMW) in 1999
 Hayabusa Terra, a surface feature on the dwarf planet Pluto
 Ken Hayabusa
 Machine Hayabusa, a Japanese 1976 anime

See also 
 Hayabusachō, district in Tokyo